Selwyn District Council is the territorial authority for the Selwyn District of New Zealand. The council was formed in 1989. A Selwyn County Council previously operated in the area between 1876 and 1910.

The council is led by the mayor of Selwyn, who is currently . There are also ten ward councillors.

Composition
Councillors are elected once every three years, using the first-past-the post system. The last election to take place was in October 2022.

Councillors

 Mayor: 
 Ellesmere Ward (2): Shane Ngapou O Te Hahi Epiha, Elizabeth Mundt
 Malvern Ward (2): Lydia Gliddon, Bob Mugford
 Rolleston Ward (3): Phil Dean, Sophie McInnes, Nicole Reid 
 Springs Ward (3): Debra Hasson, Malcolm Lyall, Grant Miller

Community boards

 Malvern Community Board (5): 
 Tawera Community Subdivision (1): Sean Ellis	
 Hawkins Subdivision (2): Ken May, Sharn Nu'u	
 West Melton Subdivision (2): Calvin Payne, Bruce Russell	

In 2020, the council had 282 staff, including 41 earning more than $100,000. According to the right-wing Taxpayers' Union think tank, residential rates averaged $2,488.

References

External links

 Official website

Selwyn District
Politics of Canterbury, New Zealand
Territorial authorities of New Zealand